Dance on the Blacktop is the third studio album by American shoegaze band Nothing. It is the last album to feature bassist Nick Bassett (also the guitarist of Whirr) and founding member, vocalist and guitarist Brandon Setta before both departed the band between 2018 and 2019, respectively. The album was released on August 24, 2018 by Relapse Records.

Background 
In October 2017, it was announced that Nothing had begun recording a third studio album at Dreamland Studio in Woodstock, New York with producer John Agnello. The band took a break from recording the album in December 2017 for a mini tour with Ceremony.

On June 5, 2018, the first single from the album, "Zero Day", was released. A preview of the song debuted in Revolver magazine on May 30, 2018. The same day as the single's release, Nothing announced the track listing, album release date and their fall 2018 tour, which involved supporting acts Swirlies, Big Bite and Smut.

The second single, "Blue Line Baby", was released on July 11, 2018, accompanied with a music video a week later. Revolver described the track and the music video as "gorgeously surreal" and "ethereal".

On August 9, 2018, "The Carpenter's Son", the third and final single prior to the release of the album, was released. Chris DeVille of Stereogum praised the track, saying the song "is Nothing at their most serene. Over the course of eight minutes, it undergoes a bit of dynamic fluctuation, but mostly it's a gorgeous slow-drift that demonstrates how powerful Nothing can be without ever roaring the way they often do".

Critical reception 

Dance on the Blacktop received critical acclaim upon its release. At Metacritic, which assigns a normalized rating out of 100 to reviews from mainstream publications, the album received an average score of 77, based on 13 reviews, indicating "generally favourable reviews".

Track listing

Personnel
Dance on the Blacktop album personnel adapted from album credits.

Nothing
 Domenic Palermo – vocals, guitar, record producer, art direction
 Brandon Setta – vocals, guitar
 Kyle Kimball – percussion
 Nick Bassett  – bass, keyboards

Additional personnel
 John Agnello – engineering, mixing, production
 Domenick Antieatro – assistant
 Greg Calbi – mastering 
 Garrett "Kevin" Deblock – assistant
 Demon Drums – drum technician
 Steve Fallone – assistant
 Carlos Hernandez – overdubs
 Alex Lipsen – overdubs
 Ryan Lowry – photography
 Mark McCoy – art direction
 Emily Rittenhouse – assistant
 Jacob Speis – layout

References 

2018 albums
Nothing (band) albums
Relapse Records albums
Albums produced by John Agnello